Nahata Jogendranath Mondal Smriti Mahavidyalaya, established in 1985, is a general degree college in Nahata. It offers undergraduate courses in arts, commerce and sciences. it is affiliated to West Bengal State University (formerly affiliated to University of Kolkata).

Departments

Arts and Commerce
Bengali
English
Political Science
History 
Sanskrit
Geography
Education 
Commerce
Physical Education 
Economics
Music
Philosophy 
Defence Studies
Sociology

Accreditation
Nahata Jogendranath Mandal Smriti Mahavidyalaya is recognized by the University Grants Commission (UGC).

See also
Education in India
List of colleges in West Bengal
Education in West Bengal

References

External links

Educational institutions established in 1985
Colleges affiliated to West Bengal State University
Universities and colleges in North 24 Parganas district
1985 establishments in West Bengal